Mariana Brambilla (born March 19, 2000, in Porto Alegre, Brazil), is a female professional volleyball player, playing as an opposite.

Professional career 
On 16 January 2022 she signed with Greek powerhouse Panathinaikos. On 27 May 2022 she was announced by the French team Pays d'Aix Venelles Volley-Ball.

National team 
She competed for the Brazil women's national under-18 volleyball team at the 2017 FIVB Volleyball Girls' U18 World Championship.

Titles

National championships
 2021/2022  Greek Championship, with Panathinaikos

National cups
 2021/2022  Greek Cup, with Panathinaikos

References

External links
 profile at FIVB Volleyball Girls' U18 World Championship 2017 website
 profile at Georgia Tech website

2000 births
Living people
Panathinaikos Women's Volleyball players